"999" is a Swedish-language song by Swedish alternative rock band Kent from their tenth studio album Jag är inte rädd för mörkret (I am not afraid of the dark).  It was released as the album's lead single on 28 March 2012. The song peaked at number ten in Sweden, becoming Kent's sixteenth top ten single but their lowest-charting lead single in the band's career.

Kent could have performed the song on the Swedish-Norwegian TV talk show Skavlan, but when SVT wanted Kent to play a shorter version of the song, the band chose instead to not appear at all.

Track listing
"999" – 6:53

Charts

Weekly charts

Year-end charts

References

Kent (band) songs
2012 singles
Songs written by Joakim Berg
2012 songs
Sonet Records singles